Muthi Bhar Chaawal is a Pakistani television series directed by Sangeeta and originally aired on TV One in 2008. The series is based on the director's own film of the same name which in turn was based on the classic Urdu novella, "Ek Chadar Maili Si" by Rajinder Singh Bedi. The series stars Resham and Ahsan Khan.

Plot 

The story revolves around the village life where a woman lives with her children, her husband and his family. One day, Rano's husband dies suddenly. She struggles to raise her children as she becomes widow. While on the other hand, her in-laws come with proposal of her young brother-in-law and ask her forcefully to marry her whom she treats just as her brother.

Cast 

 Resham
 Ahsan Khan
 Babar Ali
 Fareeha Jabeen
 Rashid Mehmood
 Aisha Haq

Production 

In August 2007, it reported that Sangeeta will made TV series on her classical Urdu film Mutthi Bhar Chawal for which she considered Meera, Saima Noor and Resham to portray the leading character. Later that year, it confirmed that Resham will play the leading character in the series that was played Sangeeta herself in the film.

Accolades
 Lux Style Award for Best TV Play (Satellite)-Nominated 
 Lux Style Award for Best TV Actress (Satellite)-Resham-Nominated

References 

Pakistani television series